Olen is a municipality located in the Belgian province of Antwerp. The municipality comprises three towns, situated on a south–north axis:
South of the motorway E313 and the Albert Canal is Olen proper, also called Olen-Centrum (Saint-Martins parish).
Between the Albert Canal and Olen-station (railroad from Antwerp to Neerpelt and Hasselt) is the town of Boekel, also called Onze-Lieve-Vrouw-Olen (parish) or Achter-Olen (Behind-Olen).
North of the railroad is the town of St.-Jozef-Olen (parish), also called Olen-Fabriek (Olen-Factory, a refinery along the old canal Herentals-Bocholt that was at its origin).

In 2021, Olen had a total population of 12,600. The total area is 23.10 km².

History of Uranium mining

In the 1920s and 1930s the Union Minière du Haut Katanga company, operating in the then Belgian colony of Congo, had a virtual monopoly of the world uranium market (holding most of the deposits known at the time). The uranium mined in Congo was mostly transported to the UMHK refinery for uranium ore which was located in Olen.

Some 1200 tonnes of uranium stored at the Olen refinery were captured by the Germans during the invasion and occupation of Belgium in 1940, and only recovered by US troops at the end of World War 2.

Notable people
 Walter van den Broeck (b. Olen 28 March 1941), writer

References

External links

Official website - Information available in Dutch, limited information available in English and French

Municipalities of Antwerp Province
Populated places in Antwerp Province